Peter "Lauchmonen" Kempadoo (1926 – 24 August 2019) was a writer and broadcaster from Guyana. He also worked as a development worker in the Caribbean, Africa and Asia. He moved in 1953 to the UK, where he built a career in print journalism as well as radio and television broadcasting, and published two novels, Guiana Boy in 1960 — the first novel by a Guyanese of Indian descent — and Old Thom's Harvest in 1965, before returning to Guyana in 1970. He died in London, aged 92.

Biography

He was born on a sugar estate to James Kempadoo, aka Lauchmonen, and Priscilla Alemeloo Tambran, both Tamils. Peter Kempadoo was educated first at St. Joseph Anglican School, then went on, at the age of 10, to attend Port Mourant Roman Catholic School. There he passed the Junior and Senior Cambridge examinations, before becoming a pupil-teacher at Port Mourant and, at 17, a certified teacher. Moving in 1947 to Georgetown, he trained as a nurse at Georgetown Public Hospital, and reported on hospital matters for the Daily Argosy until he was invited to join the staff.

Having married in 1952, Kempadoo migrated the following year with his family to England, where he worked for the BBC, and the Central Office of Information.

During this time he wrote his first novel, Guiana Boy. Published in 1960 (re-issued as Guyana Boy in 2002 by Peepal Tree Press), this was the first novel by a Guyanese of Indian descent. It draws on his own life as the son of sugar workers to portray a world lacking in freedom, but where the workers struggle to maintain their identity as Madrassis in their rice plots, their fishing expeditions and in the feasts and festivities their ancestors brought from India. The Caribbean Review of Books described the novel as "an intimate, clear-eyed portrait of Indo-Guyanese rural life", in which the author "channels the spirits of dignified misfits to dismantle the rigid hierarchies governing former plantation societies, all while honouring the polyglot traditions their descendants have elected to preserve."

In addition to Guyana Boy, he was the author of another novel, Old Thom's Harvest (1965), which focuses on religious and ethnic practices in the life of a rural family. Kempadoo's work has been anthologised in The Sun's Eye (ed. Anne Walmsley) and My Lovely Native Land (ed. A. J. Seymour). He has also co-authored with his wife a booklet entitled A–Z of Guyanese Words.

In 1970, Kempadoo returned with his family to Guyana, where he produced local radio programmes such as Rural Life Guyana, We the People, Our Kind of Folk and Jarai (with Marc Matthews).

Kempadoo also lived for some years in Barbados, but was mainly based in the UK.

In 2016, as part of activities held to celebrate the 50th anniversary of Guyana's independence, Kempadoo was honoured at the Jubilee Literary Festival at the University of Guyana. In 2018 he was honoured with a Windrush Lifetime Service Award.

He died in London on 24 August 2019.

Family life
Kempadoo married Rosemary Read in 1952 and Mayrose Abbensetts in 1992. He was the father of Manghanita, sexology professor Kamala, Shamanee, photographer Roshini , Malasula, Valmiki, novelist Oonya, Sanjhevi, and Anoushka. He lived in London, England.

Bibliography
 Guiana Boy (Crawley, Sussex: New Literature). Reissued as Guyana Boy, Peepal Tree Press, 2002. 
 Old Thom's Harvest (London: Eyre and Spottiswoode, 1965).

References

External links
 Petamber Persaud, "Peter Kempadoo – Preserving our literary heritage" (based on interview 13 March 2006, in Georgetown, Guyana), Kyk-Over-Al, 18 March 2006.
 "Frank Birbalsingh interviews Peter Kempadoo", Arts Journal: Critical Perspectives on Contemporary Literature, March 2005, Vol. 1 Issue 2, p. 36.

Guyanese novelists
1926 births
2019 deaths
Black British writers
Guyanese emigrants to England
Indo-Guyanese people
20th-century British novelists
British people of Indo-Guyanese descent
British male novelists
Recipients of the Wordsworth McAndrew Award